RING finger protein 146 is a protein that in humans is encoded by the RNF146 gene.

References

Further reading

RING finger proteins